Francesco Garbarino (Genoa, 1607Genoa, 1672) was the 120th Doge of the Republic of Genoa and king of Corsica.

Biography 
His dogate, the seventy-fifth in biennial succession and the one hundred and twentieth in republican history, was characterized by the continuation of various public works in the republican territory such as the Molo Nuovo in Genoa, the fortress of Vado Ligure and in the Savona area, on a favorable proposal by the protectors of the Bank of Saint George, the opening of a new road in the hinterland of Ceriale.

See also 
 Republic of Genoa
 Doge of Genoa

References 

17th-century Doges of Genoa
1607 births
1672 deaths